Szank is a  village and municipality in Bács-Kiskun county, in the Southern Great Plain region of southern Hungary.

Geography

Twin cities 
Porumbenii Mari 
Mauru  
Bačka Topola  
Quindici   
Hiiumaa

External links 
 Szank honlapja
 Szank térképe

Populated places in Bács-Kiskun County